Captain Henry Hall was an American from Dennis, Massachusetts who fought in the American Revolutionary War, who later was the first to successfully cultivate cranberries.

References

External links
mention of him

Year of birth missing
Year of death missing
People from Dennis, Massachusetts
People of colonial Massachusetts
People of Massachusetts in the American Revolution
American farmers